The Netherlands men's national basketball team represents the Netherlands in international basketball matches. The national team is governed by Basketball Nederland.

The Dutch have reached the European Basketball Championship on 16 occasions. Their best results at the event came in 1983, where they finished in fourth place. They have also qualified for the FIBA World Cup once, in 1986. However, in recent years the national team has struggled to maintain consistency to reach major international tournaments.

The team represents itself as the Orange Lions.

History

1946–1991: Early years

The Netherlands were one of the teams that played in the 1946, 1947, 1949 and 1951 EuroBasket tournaments. During this period, the 5th place finish in 1949 was the best performance by the national team.

1961–1991: EuroBasket success & World Cup debut
The Oranje qualified for three European Basketball Championships in the 1960s (1961, 1963, 1967). After three consecutive missed tournaments, the Netherlands had another three EuroBasket appearance stretch from 1975, 1977, and 1979. During the 1977 EuroBasket, the Netherlands' star player Kees Akerboom shined during the tournament. He finished the competition as the top scorer, and earned a spot on the All-Tournament Team.

At EuroBasket 1983, the Dutch had its biggest success in history under head coach Vladimir Heger. The national team achieved fourth place at the tournament. The Dutch wound up reaching the semi-finals, but eventually fell to Italy. In the third-place game they would lose again, this time to the Soviet Union.

Three years after achieving success at the continental level, the Netherlands qualified to the World Cup for the first time in 1986. The national team ultimately did not make it out of the group stage though, finishing the tournament with an (2–3) record to place 14th overall.

1991–2012: Long mediocre period

From 1991 until 2012, the Netherlands did not qualify for a EuroBasket tournament. Star player Francisco Elson, former NBA-champion, represented the team on several occasions but the team never came close to qualifying. During this period, notable Dutch players like Dan Gadzuric were not willing to play for the national team. Home games were usually played at the Topsportcentrum in Almere and usually had little to no media attention or fan support in the Netherlands.

Rising from the ashes (2012–2015)

In December 2012, it was announced that the Netherlands national team would be dissolved for 2 years, because the national federation NBB {Netherlands Basketball Bond} was not willing to invest money in to it. After a campaign by Dutch players who played in the Dutch Basketball League, the national team was eventually saved. Sports broadcaster Sport1 became the main sponsor and DBL-teams invested in the team, which started playing again.

During August 2013, the Netherlands was on its way to qualification for EuroBasket 2015, but lost two games 20–0 because the team played with two players  – Mohamed Kherrazi and Sean Cunningham – who were identified as foreign players by FIBA. The NBB believed that both were eligible players, and was upset that the attention came up after the Netherlands already won 2 games.

"Miracle of 2014"

At the start of the second 2015-qualification round, things looked bad for the Oranje. The DBL-teams didn't have any more money to invest in the team and the NBB  wasn't ready to take the team back. Head coach Toon van Helfteren, who worked as a volunteer, still did prepare for the qualifying games. He invited 42 players to play for the national team, but after most (notable) players rejected the offer, he started his first training camp with 7 players. The team eventually shocked the world, by beating heavy favorite Montenegro to get the second place in their group. On 27 August 2014, the Dutch national team qualified for EuroBasket for the first time in 25 years.

Return to EuroBasket (2015–present)
The national team left the NBB and FEB, from 2015 the team was run by the NMT. Coach Van Helfteren then had his contract with the national team extended. In contrast to the summer of 2014, big name players from foreign leagues applied to play for the national team.

In the first game at EuroBasket 2015, the Dutch beat Georgia 73–72 behind Charlon Kloof's 22 and Worthy de Jong's 16 points. The Netherlands remaining four games though were all loses, but only by single digits to power houses such as Croatia and Greece.

On 22 July 2019, Italian coach Maurizio Buscaglia signed on to become head coach of the Netherlands, replacing Toon van Helfteren who stepped down. After a disappointing EuroBasket 2022, in which the Netherlands went winless, Buscaglia was sacked. On 6 October 2022, Radenko Varagić was appointed as interim head coach for the remaining World Cup qualifying campaign.

Competitive record

FIBA World Cup

Olympic Games

EuroBasket

Results and fixtures

2021

2022

2023

Team

Current roster
Roster for the 2023 FIBA World Cup Qualifiers matches on 23 and 26 February 2023 against Georgia and Ukraine.

Depth chart

List of head coaches

Past rosters
1946 EuroBasket: finished 6th among 10 teams

3 Chris van Laar, 4 Joop Koper, 5 Henk Mik, 6 Wim van Someren, 7 Freek Brandt, 8 Jan Aldenberg, 9 Henk Koper, 13 Chris Kugelein, 14 Wim Kunnen, 15 Ben Gerritsma (Coach: Dick Schmüll)

1947 EuroBasket: finished 11th among 14 teams

3 Joop Koper, 4 Chris van Laar, 5 Freek Brandt, 6 Jaap van Veen, 7 Wim van Someren, 8 B Winkel, 9 Tan Eng Hau, 10 Henk Koper, 20 Visser (Coach: Dick Schmüll)

1949 EuroBasket: finished 5th among 7 teams

3 Jaap van Veen, 4 Jaap van Veen, 5 Tom Losekoot, 6 Tan Eng Hau, 7 Henk Koper, 8 Joop Koper, 9 Wim van Someren, 10 Henk van de Broek, 11 Jan Hille, 20 Freek Brandt (Coach: Dick Schmüll)

1951 EuroBasket: finished 10th among 17 teams

3 Tim de Jong, 4 Johan de Hoop, 5 Bob van der Valk, 6 Ab Gootjes, 7 Jaap van Veen, 8 Henk van de Broek, 9 Vok Alberda, 10 Kees van der Schuijt, 11 Jan Hille, 12 Piet Ouderland, 13 Ton Koemans, 14 Rinus van Eijkeren (Coach: Dick Schmüll)

1961 EuroBasket: finished 15th among 19 teams

4 Henny Braun, 5 Antonie Boot, 6 Jan Bruin, 7 Jan Driehuis, 8 Dolf Pouw, 9 Wim Franke, 10 Maarten Sleeswijk, 11 Gerrit Kok, 12 Peter de Jong, 13 Gunter van de Berg, 14 Franciscus de Haan, 15 Hans Perrier (Coach: Jan Janbroers)

1963 EuroBasket: finished 16th among 16 teams

4 Jos Pelk, 5 Antonie Boot, 6 Jan Bruin, 7 Jan Driehuis, 8 Simon Schagen, 9 Bob Grosmann, 10 Wim Franke, 11 Gerrit Kok, 12 Roelof Tuinstra, 13 Jan Schappert, 14 Franciscus de Haan, 15 Frederik Witte (Coach: Jan Janbroers)  

1967 EuroBasket: finished 16th among 16 teams

4 Petrus Rijsewik, 5 Antonie Boot, 6 Jan Bruin, 7 Frank Kales, 8 Antonius van der Kroon, 9 Karel Pastor, 10 Karel Vrolijk, 11 Erik Jager, 12 Roelof Tuinstra, 13 Erik van Woerkom, 14 Franciscus de Haan, 15 Frederik Witte (Coach: Egon Steuer)

1975 EuroBasket: finished 10th among 12 teams

4 Jan Dekker, 5 Antonie Boot, 6 Jan Sikking, 7 Hugo Harrewijn, 8 Herman Pluim, 9 Walter Ombre, 10 John van Vliet, 11 Kees Akerboom, 12 Dan Cramer, 13 Toon van Helfteren, 14 Pieter van Tuyll, 15 Harry Kip (Coach: Bill Sheridan)

1977 EuroBasket: finished 7th among 12 teams

4 Al Faber, 5 Jan Dekker, 6 Jimmy Woudstra, 7 Cees Limmen, 8 Emill Hagens, 9 Bert Kragtwijk, 10 Cock van de Lagemaat, 11 Dan Cramer, 12 Kees Akerboom, 13 Jan Loorbach, 14 Renso Zwiers, 15 Harry Kip (Coach: Jan Janbroers)

1979 EuroBasket: finished 10th among 12 teams

4 Bert Kragtwijk, 5 Jan Dekker, 6 Dan Cramer, 7 Mitchell Plaat, 8 Emill Hagens, 9 Al Faber, 10 Sid Bruinsma, 11 Jimmy Woudstra, 12 Kees Akerboom, 13 Toon van Helfteren, 14 Pieter van Tuyll, 15 Harry Kip (Coach: Tom Quinn)

1983 EuroBasket: finished 4th among 12 teams

4 René Ridderhof, 5 Ronald Schilp, 6 Randy Wiel, 7 Mitchell Plaat, 8 Jelle Esveldt, 9 Al Faber, 10 Jos Kuipers, 11 Dan Cramer, 12 Cock van de Lagemaat, 13 Henk Pieterse, 14 Roland van den Bergh, 15 Rob van Essen (Coach: Vladimír Heger)    

1985 EuroBasket: finished 12th among 12 teams

4 Martin Esajas, 5 Ronald Schilp, 6 Martin de Vries, 7 Marco de Waard, 8 Jelle Esveldt, 9 Ron van der Schaaf, 10 John Franken, 11 Cock van de Lagemaat, 12 Jos Kuipers, 13 Peter van Noord, 14 Hans Heijdeman, 15 Rob van Essen (Coach: Vladimír Heger)

1986 FIBA World Cup: finished 14th among 24 teams

4 Rik Smits, 5 Jelle Esveldt, 6 Ronald Schilp, 7 Cock van de Lagemaat, 8 Raymond Bottse, 9 Rene Ebeltjes, 10 Chris van Dinten, 11 Hans Heijdeman, 12 Erik Griekspoor, 13 Emill Hagens, 14 Marco de Waard, 15 Peter van Noord (Coach: Ruud Harrewijn)

1987 EuroBasket: finished 10th among 12 teams

4 John Emanuels, 5 Ronald Schilp, 6 Marco de Waard, 7 Cees van Rootselaar, 8 Jelle Esveldt, 9 Okke te Velde, 10 Rik Smits, 11 Chris van Dinten, 12 Peter van Noord, 13 Toon van Helfteren, 14 Henk Pieterse, 15 Jos Kuipers (Coach: Ruud Harrewijn)

1989 EuroBasket: finished 8th among 8 teams

4 Raymond Bottse, 5 John Emanuels, 6 Marco de Waard, 7 Cees van Rootselaar, 8 Rolf Franke, 9 Okke te Velde, 10 Richard van Poelgeest, 11 Frans Houben, 12 Milko Lieverst, 13 Paul Vrind, 14 Peter Dam, 15 Jos Kuipers (Coach: Ruud Harrewijn)

2015 EuroBasket: finished 21st among 24 teams

0 Yannick Franke, 5 Leon Williams, 6 Worthy de Jong, 7 Charlon Kloof, 9 Mohamed Kherrazi, 10 Ralf de Pagter, 12 Kees Akerboom, Jr., 13 Roeland Schaftenaar, 18 Nicolas de Jong, 21 Robin Smeulders, 23 Henk Norel, 44 Arvin Slagter (C) (Coach: Toon van Helfteren)

2022 EuroBasket: finished 22nd among 24 teams

0 Yannick Franke, 1 Keye van der Vuurst de Vries, 5 Leon Williams, 6 Worthy de Jong (C), 9 Mohamed Kherrazi, 11 Shane Hammink,13 Roeland Schaftenaar, 14 Jesse Edwards, 30 Olaf Schaftenaar, 32 Matt Haarms, 33 Jito Kok, 90 Charlon Kloof(Coach: Maurizio Buscaglia)

See also

Sport in the Netherlands
Netherlands women's national basketball team
Netherlands men's national under-20 basketball team
Netherlands men's national under-18 basketball team
Netherlands men's national under-16 basketball team

References

External links

 
Netherlands FIBA profile 
Dutch National Team – Men at Eurobasket.com
Netherlands Basketball Records at FIBA Archive

 
Men's national basketball teams
 
Basketball
1946 establishments in the Netherlands